Nonsense in the Dark is the debut studio album by English band Filthy Dukes. The album was released on 24 March 2009 through Polydor / Fiction Records.

Track listing

References

2009 debut albums
Filthy Dukes albums